Religion in Trinidad and Tobago, which is a multi-religious country, is classifiable as follows:

The largest religious group is Christianity with 63.2 percent of the population. This includes Protestant Christians (with Anglicans,  Presbyterians,  Methodists, Evangelicals, Pentecostals,  Shouter or Spiritual Baptists and regular Baptists) as well as  Roman Catholics. Hindus account for 20.4 percent,  Muslims for 5.6 percent. There is an Afro-Caribbean syncretic faith, the  Orisha faith (formerly called Shangos) with 1 percent and there are Rastafaris with 0.3 percent. The "Other Religions" category accounts for 7.0 percent and "None/not shared" for 2.5.

The fastest-growing groups are a host of American-style Evangelical and  Fundamentalist churches usually grouped as "Pentecostal" by most Trinidadians. The Church of Jesus Christ of Latter-day Saints (known as "Mormons") has also expanded its presence in the country since the late 1970s. It reported 3,524 members in 9 congregations in 2019. 

According to the 2011 Census, 33.4% of the population is Protestant (including 12.0% Pentecostal, 5.7% Anglican, 4.1% Seventh-day Adventist, 3.0% Presbyterian or Congregational, 1.2% Baptist, and 0.1% Methodist), 21.6% as Roman Catholic, 18.2% as Hindu and 5.0% as Muslim. A small number of individuals subscribed to traditional Caribbean religions with African roots, such as the Spiritual Baptists (sometimes called Shouter Baptists) (5.7%); and the Orisha (0.1%). Smaller groups included Jehovah's Witnesses (1.5%) and "unaffiliated" (2.2%). There is also a small Buddhist community.

Afro-Caribbean syncretic groups
Spiritual Baptist
National Evangelical Spiritual Baptist
West Indies Spiritual Sacred Order
Royal Priesthood Spiritual Baptist Archdiocese of Trinidad and Tobago and the Western Hemisphere (under the Leadership of the Archbishop & Founder Addelon Braveboy, the Episkopos Bishop of all the Churches of the Royal Priesthood)
King of Kings Spiritual Baptist, Faith Ministries International Church of the Royal Priesthood
Solomon Healing Temple, Church of the Royal Priesthood.
St Francis Divine Healing Temple, Church of the Royal Priesthood
St Philomena Mystical Court, Church of the Royal Priesthood
Santería
 Orisha also known as Shango or Ifá
Ojubo Orisa Omolu - Ose'tura Ifa Temple of Light. 
Rastafari

Baháʼí Faith 

The Baháʼí Faith in Trinidad and Tobago begins with a mention by `Abdu'l-Bahá, then head of the religion, in 1916 as the Caribbean was among the places Baháʼís should take the religion to.  The first Baháʼí to visit came in 1927 while pioneers arrived by 1956 and the first Baháʼí Local Spiritual Assembly was elected in 1957 In 1971 the first Baháʼí National Spiritual Assembly was elected. A count of the community then noted 27 assemblies with Baháʼís living in 77 locations. Since then Baháʼís have participated in several projects for the benefit of the wider community and in 2005/10 various sources report near 1.2% of the country, about 10–16,000 citizens, are Baháʼís.

Hindu groups

Sanatan Dharma Maha Sabha
 SWAHA
Arya Samaj
Brahmo Samaj
Chinmaya Mission
Divine Life Society
International Society for Krishna Consciousness

Islamic groups

Anjuman Sunnat-ul-Jamaat Association
Trinidad Muslim League
Tackveeyatul Islamic Association 
Ahmadiyya Anjuman Isha'at Islam Trinidad and Tobago Inc.
Ahmadiyya Muslim Community
Tobago Muslim Association
Sunni-Shia Relations

Jewish groups 
Jewish settlement in Trinidad and Tobago dates back to the 17th century when a number of Jewish merchants from Suriname settled in the 1660s, when the island was still under Spanish control. By the 1790s, when it passed into British hands, the community had disappeared from record.

In the 19th century a small number of Sephardi Jewish families from Curaçao settled in Trinidad but left no trace of an organised community. In the late 1930s an estimated six hundred East European Jews settled in Trinidad, mainly Port of Spain, escaping the growth of Nazism in the region. The settlers established synagogues in rented houses in the capital and consecrated a Jewish cemetery. After World War II the majority of Trinidadian Jews migrated to the United States, Israel, and Canada. In 2007 an estimated 55 Jews lived in Trinidad and Tobago.

Seventh-day Adventists
The Caribbean Union Conference of the Seventh-day Adventist Church recognizes 620 churches holding a membership of 236, 257 Adventists in Trinidad and Tobago, as of October 3, 2016. Because Seventh-day Adventists consider spiritual well-being to be holistic, there are notable contributions to the healthcare system, such as the Community Hospital of Seventh-day Adventists in Port of Spain, Trinidad. The University of the Southern Caribbean (formerly Caribbean Union College) is a Seventh-day Adventist educational facility providing Christian education to undergraduate and graduate students on the island of Trinidad.

Freedom of religion
The constitution of Trinidad and Tobago establishes the freedom of religion and prohibits religious discrimination. An anti-blasphemy law is part of the legal code but is not enforced.

Religious groups may register with the government in order to be able to perform marriages, sponsor missionaries, or accept tax-exempt donations.

Voluntary religious instruction is available as part of the public school curriculum. The government subsidizes religious private schools affiliated with Christian, Muslim, and Hindu groups.

In 2017, Trinidad and Tobago set a uniform minimum marriage age of 18 years. Previously, different age limits were enforced for different religious groups. While many organizations (and particularly religiously affiliated women's organizations) welcomed this change, some religious organizations such as the orthodox Hindu organization Sanatan Dharma Maha Sabha stated that they would oppose the law on the grounds that it infringes on religious freedom and their view that girls 16-17 who are pregnant should be able to get married to the father of their child.

The government of Trinidad and Tobago hosts the Inter-Religious Organization, an interfaith coordinating committee with representatives from 25 religious groups, including Christian, Muslim, Hindu, Orisha and Baháʼí groups. Chaplains from the various religious denominations present in Trinidad Tobago are able to provide religious services to inmates in prisons.

The Government of Trinidad and Tobago provides substantial subventions to religious groups.  In 2003 the government provided TT$ 420,750 to religious groups.

References